Rehasher is a punk rock band based in Gainesville, Florida, signed to No Idea Records. Although started as a band, Rehasher became the solo side project of ska punk band Less Than Jake bass player/back up and lead singer Roger Lima as their lead singer and rhythm guitarist. The band's first line-up included Manganelli and Ryan Geis sharing lead vocals and guitars, bass guitarist Gui Amador (formerly of As Friends Rust) and drummer Jake Crown.

Rehasher's third album Make the Noise was released on July 10, 2015. Following the release of Make the Noise, the band added lead guitarist Richard Klinghoffer, co-lead singer and bassist Tony Farah, and drummer Alex Klausner to resume touring. Work on new recordings began in late 2017. In 2021 the band released a covers album.

Members 
Current lineup
 Roger Lima – lead and backing vocals, rhythm guitar
 Richard Klinghoffer – lead guitar, backing vocals
 Tony Farah – bass guitar, lead and backing vocals
 Alex Klausner – drums, backing vocals

Former members
 Ryan Geis – lead guitar, backing vocals
 Gui Amador – bass guitar
 Jake Crown – drums, backing vocals

Discography

Albums
 Off Key Melodies (2004), released in 2004 on No Idea Records.
 High Speed Access to My Brain (2009), released August 28, 2009; vinyl version on Paper + Plastick, CD version on Moathouse Records.
 Clock Smash! (2015) released June 2 on Moathouse Records. Vinyl version on Saint November records.
 Make the Noise (2015) released July 10 on Moathouse Records Vinyl version on Moathouse Records.

Other songs
 "PVC" (exclusive to PureVolume and MySpace).

References

External links
 
 Rehasher on No Idea Records

Pop punk groups from Florida
Musical groups from Gainesville, Florida
2002 establishments in Florida
Musical groups established in 2002